The Jewel Bain House Number 2 is a historic house at 3601 South Cherry Street in Pine Bluff, Arkansas.  It is a roughly cubic brick structure, two stories in height, covered by a hip roof.  The brick walls are accented with carrara glass.  A carport extends from the main block to the south, and a single-story ell extends south.  Built in 1937, the house was the second of four houses designed by Jewel Bain for her family.  It is rare within the state as an excellent example of a residential application of the Moderne style of architecture.

The house was listed on the National Register of Historic Places in 2013.

See also
National Register of Historic Places listings in Jefferson County, Arkansas

References

Houses completed in 1837
Houses in Pine Bluff, Arkansas
Houses on the National Register of Historic Places in Arkansas
National Register of Historic Places in Pine Bluff, Arkansas